The Accademia dei Georgofili (Academy of Georgofili) is an educational institution in Florence, Italy.  It was established in 1753. The academy has been a historic institution for over 250 years, and is best known for promoting, amongst scholars and landowners, the studying of agronomy, forestry, economy, geography and agriculture.

History
The Academy of Georgofili was established in Florence at the beginning of June 1753 as a response to an essay by the abbot Ubaldo Montelatici of the order of Canons Regular of the Lateran, who proposed new horizons of agricultural research. It originated from the need to improve agricultural production through rational utilisation of the soil. In 1783 it merged with the Botany Society and received in concession the Giardino dei Semplici (medicinal herb garden). With the Grand Duke Peter Leopold of Lorraine, who granted it his protection, the academy acquired notable prestige. It brought to attention many issues facing agriculture and agricultural economics, including the renewal of agricultural equipment, education, cattle, tenant farming, draining of swampland, land reclamation, grain marketing, etc.
In 1768, Luigi Tramontini earned the second prize in a contest seeking ways to increase livestock in Tuscany.

The early years of the Academy was not marked by activities of special importance, the association rose to national importance by the nineteenth century, due to the studies in plow by Raffaello Lambruschini and activities and research by Cosimo Ridolfi, one of the leading agronomists of the age of the Italian unification. Ridolfi proposed the reflection of greater clarity of the agronomic, geographic, economic, and social future of the land of hills that were for centuries the heart of Italian society, being marginalized by the advent of mechanized agriculture on the plains of Europe.

In addition to studies of Ridolfi, the Academy was fruitfully engaged in the nineteenth century, in the production of wine and an awareness of the poor quality of a great majority of Italian wines, and the need to radically change the technology of the cellar on the forms on the pomological, and thus was born the largest catalog of varieties of fruit on the Peninsula, the Pamona of George Gallesio.

On the night between 26 and 27 May 1993, an explosive device was set off in a Fiat Fiorino packed with explosives near the historic Tower of the Pulci, killing five people and wounding 48 others. The blast caused damage to the library of the academy, resulting in three years of restoration work in order to restore the building to its former state. The incident became known as the Via dei Georgofili bombing.

Historical archives and library
The historical archives covering the period of 1753-1911, with a total of over 12,000 manuscripts preserved, and the library is equipped with 70,000 volumes.

Name, motto, and emblem
The term Georgofili comes from the Greek, and literally means "Earth-work-lovers", i.e.: "Devotees of agriculture.". The emblem of the Academy contains the symbols of agricultural activity, dedicated to the Goddess Ceres (I.e. an ear of grain, an olive branch, and a cluster of graphes) as well as those associated with economy activities and commerce dedicated to Mercury (caduceus, intertwined snakes and wings).

The motto of the academy is Prosperitati publicae augendae (To increase the wealth of the state) and highlights how the activities of the Georgofili are towards public interest.

List of presidents

Ubaldo Montelatici - tutor (4 June 1753)
Emmanuel de Nay, Count of Richecourt (1753 - 1757)
Giovan Gualberto Franceschi (1757 - 1758)
Roberto Pucci (1758 - 1767)
Francesco Orsini Rosenberg (1767)
Giuseppe Rospigliosi (1797 - 1801)
Ubaldo Ferroni (1801 - 1821)
Paul Garzoni Venturi (1821th - 1842)
Marquis Cosimo Ridolfi (1842 - 1865)
Raphael Lambruschini (1865 - 1871)
Luigi Ridolfi (1871 - 1909)
Francesco Guicciardini (1909 - 1913)
Carlo Ridolfi (1915 - 1918)
Riccardo Dalla Volta (1918 - 1926)
Arrigo Serpieri (1926 - in 1944)
Francesco Bertolino - Commissioner (1944 -1946)
Renzo Giuliani (1946 the 1962)
Gasparini Marino (1963-1977)
Joseph Stefanelli (1977 - 1986)
Franco Scaramuzzi (since 1986)

Publications
The academy edits the edition of the Journal of the History of Agriculture

See also
Società Agraria di Torino
Orto Botanico di Firenze

References

Mark Tabarrini. Of studj and events of the Royal Academy of Georgofili in the first century of its existence. Florence, Cellini, 1856.
Bottini Louis, Dino Zucchini, Calvori Pio et al., Italian academies and agrarian societies, the Royal Academy of Georgofili, Florence 1931
Renzo Giuliani, the oldest academy of agrarian Europe celebrated 200 years of life, farming in Italy, Rome, Jan.. 1954
Marucelli T., Studies, and the vicissitudes of the Royal Academy of Georgofili 1854 to 1903.
Saltini Antonio, History of Agricultural Science, vol. II, The centuries of agrarian revolution, Edagricole, Bologna, 1987, p. 197-214
Saltini Antonio, Greetings to Georgofili, July 17, 1993, I Georgofili. Proceedings of the Academy, 1993 vol XL

External links
The website of Accademia dei Georgofili
The Accademia dei Georgofili's entry on ArchivesWiki

Culture in Florence
History of agriculture
Agricultural education
1753 establishments in Italy
Learned societies of Italy
Cultural institutions of Tuscany
1753 establishments in the Grand Duchy of Tuscany
Libraries in Florence